American Opposing Rook (メリケン向かい飛車 meriken mukai hisha) is an Opposing Rook (Ranging Rook) opening in which after the player's bishop is moved to 77 as Black (or 33 as White) the pawn on the bishop's head (on the 76 square) is advanced to 75.

External links
 Yet Another Shogi Site: Meriken Opposing Rook
 Shogi (etc) Diary in Japan: American Opposing Rook
 Shogi Planet: American Opposing Rook

Shogi openings
Ranging Rook openings
Opposing Rook openings